Moscato may refer to:

Muscat (grape), a family of grapes used in wine-making
Moscato d'Asti, an Italian sparkling wine
Moscato Giallo, a variety of grape
Moscato (surname), an Italian surname